Gilles Simon was the defending champion, but lost in the second round to Tommy Haas.
Haas went to the final, but lost to Juan Mónaco 5–7, 4–6.

Seeds

Draw

Finals

Top half

Bottom half

Qualifying

Seeds

Qualifiers

Draw

First qualifier

Second qualifier

Third qualifier

Fourth qualifier

References
 Main Draw
 Qualifying Draw

International German Open - Singles
2012 International German Open